Ailian station is on Line 3 of the Shenzhen Metro. It opened on 28 December 2010. It is located on Shenhui Road.

Station layout

Exits

References

External links
 Shenzhen Metro Ailian Station (Chinese)
 Shenzhen Metro Ailian Station (English)

Railway stations in Guangdong
Shenzhen Metro stations
Longgang District, Shenzhen
Railway stations in China opened in 2010